Takur (also Romanized as Takūr; also known as Deh-e Takūr and Takor) is a village in Margan Rural District, in the Central District of Hirmand County, Sistan and Baluchestan Province, Iran. At the 2006 census, its population was 97, divided within 20 families.

References 

Populated places in Hirmand County